Sharingal is a tehsil located in Upper Dir District, Khyber Pakhtunkhwa, Pakistan. The population is 185,037 according to the 2017 census.

See also 
 List of tehsils of Khyber Pakhtunkhwa

References 

Tehsils of Khyber Pakhtunkhwa
Populated places in Upper Dir District